Vusi Sidney Mahlasela Ka Zwane (born 1965 in Pretoria, South Africa) is a Sotho South African singer-songwriter.

His music is generally described as "African folk" and he is often dubbed as "The Voice" of South Africa. His work was an inspiration to many in the anti-apartheid movement. His themes include the struggle for freedom, and forgiveness and reconciliation with enemies. Vusi has released seven studio albums on Sony in South Africa and was signed to Dave Matthews' ATO Records in 2003. Vusi can also be heard performing on Warren Haynes' Live at Bonnaroo release during the song "Soulshine", and the Dave Matthews Band song, "Everyday", from the album of the same name as well as a live version of the song with him which appears on the album The Best of What's Around Vol. 1. Vusi was also one of the performers at the Live 8 concerts and at Live Earth.  Vusi performed at Nelson Mandela's inauguration in 1994 and has subsequently performed at Nelson Mandela 90th Birthday Tribute in Hyde Park, London in 2008, and at Mandela Day at Radio City Music Hall in July 2009.  His song "When You Come Back" was used at ITV's theme song for their World Cup coverage in 2010 and Vusi performed at the FIFA World Cup Kick Off concert at Orlando Stadium in Soweto, South Africa.  In 2012, the SAMA Awards honored Vusi with a lifetime achievement award.

Recent works
His album The Voice released on ATO Records includes the popular track "Weeping", recorded with Josh Groban and Ladysmith Black Mambazo. Vusi joined Mambazo for their October–November UK tour in 2004, and again for their 2007 UK tour, again from October to November 2007.

He and other South African musicians took part in the 2002 documentary Amandla!: A Revolution in Four-Part Harmony where they recalled the days of Apartheid.

In June 2007, Mahlasela spoke of apartheid and performed "Thula Mama" at the TED Conference in Arusha, Tanzania.  He also performed at TED in Monterey, CA in March 2008.  Vusi performed at the Skoll World Forum on 14 April 2010.

On 7 July 2007 Mahlasela performed at the South African leg of Live Earth.

His album Guiding Star, as Naledi Ya Tsela (the name under which it is released in South Africa), won him the 2007 SAMA for Best Male Artist.

He has participated in videos for Playing for Change most notably "One Love" and "Stand By Me".

In April 2009, Vusi joined Bela Fleck on his Throw Down Your Heart Tour and was also featured on his album of the same name.

ITV used his song "When You Come Back" as their main theme for the opening credits of their coverage of the 2010 FIFA World Cup in South Africa. The song was very popular amongst viewers and entered the UK Official Singles Chart on 4 July 2010 at No. 70.

His most recent album, Say Africa, was produced by legendary bluesman Taj Mahal.  The album was released 18 January 2011 on ATO Records.

Discography

Studio albums

Live albums

Soundtracks

Compilation albums

References

External links
 
 
 "Thula Mama" (TEDGlobal 2007)
 "Woza" (TEDGlobal 2007)
 A profile of Vusi Mahlasela on Music.org.za
 Mail & Guardian Musical Slideshow: Vusi Mahlasela performs at the KykNET Irene Summer Series near Pretoria, South Africa, October 2009
 Playing for Change – Vusi Mahlasela
 

1965 births
Living people
ATO Records artists
People from Pretoria
South African film score composers
South African musicians
South African singer-songwriters
Wrasse Records artists
South African Sotho people
Label Bleu artists
RCA Records artists